Knob Hill may refer to:

Places
 Knob Hill, Colorado, a neighborhood of Colorado Springs, Colorado, U.S.
 Knob Hill, Indiana, an unincorporated community in the U.S.
 Knob Hill, Alberta, a locality in Wetaskiwin County, Alberta, Canada
 Knob Hill (Scarborough), a neighborhood in Scarborough, Toronto, Canada

Mountains in the United States
Knob Hill (Sweet Grass County), a mountain in Sweet Grass County, Montana
Knob Hill (Kern County), a mountain near Halfway House, Kern County, California

Other uses
 Knob Hill Farms, a defunct Canadian supermarket chain
 Knob Hill Stable, a Canadian racehorse operation

See also
 Nob Hill (disambiguation)